Avery Trufelman is an American podcaster and radio producer best known for her work on 99% Invisible (2013–2020) and its spin-off, Articles of Interest (2018–present).

Background
Born into a "radio family" of two WNYC producers, Trufelman was raised in Westchester County, New York. She attended Wesleyan University, graduating in 2013 with degrees in German and Literature. While at Wesleyan, she worked at the campus radio station WESU. After graduating, she interned for the now-defunct NPR Berlin in Germany.

Career
Following her stint with NPR, Trufelman interned with 99% Invisible, eventually becoming the show's third full-time producer (following Sam Greenspan and creator Roman Mars), a position she would hold until her departure in 2020. In 2022, she returned for a single episode as "producer emeritus".

In 2018, Trufelman spearheaded 99% Invisible'''s first spinoff series, Articles of Interest, which explores the origins of clothing pieces and fashion subcultures. The New Yorker named the first season the fourth best podcast of 2018 and the second season the sixth best podcast of 2020. Vulture named the season one finale, "Punk", the best podcast episode of 2018. At the conclusion of the second season, she announced her departure from 99% Invisible. The following year, upon selling 99% Invisible to Sirius XM, Mars transferred ownership of Articles of Interest to Trufelman. Independently, she produced a third season, American Ivy, a serialized history of preppy fashion.The New Yorker named it the sixth best podcast of 2022 while industry creatives surveyed in Vulture named it the third best.

In 2019, Trufelman was recruited to host Nice Try! for Vox Media's Curbed. The first season, Utopian, profiles various failed utopian experiments throughout history, including Jamestown, Virginia and Biosphere 2. The second season, Interior, premiered in 2021, tracing the history of various homemaking tools, including the vacuum cleaner and the crock-pot.

In 2020, following her departure from 99% Invisible, Trufelman began hosting the relaunch of New York's The Cut podcast, moving from Oakland to Brooklyn in the process. Her guests included cartoonist Allison Bechdel, screenwriters Josh Goldsmith and Cathy Yuspa, and author Michelle Zauner. Trufelman left The Cut in 2021 to resume work on Nice Try! and Articles of Interest''.

Projects

References

Living people
Wesleyan University alumni
21st-century American women writers
American women non-fiction writers
21st-century American non-fiction writers
Place of birth missing (living people)
American women podcasters
American podcasters
Writers from New York (state)
People from Westchester County, New York
1991 births